Nickel Belt is one of two federal electoral districts serving the city of Greater Sudbury, Ontario, Canada. It has been represented in the House of Commons of Canada since 1953.

Geography

It consists of:
 the part of the Territorial District of Timiskaming lying west of the townships of Fallon and Cleaver;
 the Territorial District of Sudbury, excluding:
 the part lying west of and including the townships of Shenango, Lemoine, Carty, Pinogami, Biggs, Rollo, Swayze, Cunningham, Blamey, Shipley, Singapore, Burr and Edighoffer;
 the part lying south and west of a line and including the townships of Acheson, Venturi and Ermatinger and Totten, west of and excluding the City of Greater Sudbury, and west of and including the Township of Roosevelt;
 the northeast part of the City of Greater Sudbury;
 the Town of Killarney (in the territorial district of Manitoulin and Parry Sound);
 the unorganized territory lying on the north shore of Georgian Bay and east of the town of Killarney in the Territorial District of Manitoulin; and
 the Municipality of West Nipissing (in the Territorial District of Nipissing).

History
The riding of Nickel Belt was created in 1952 from parts of Algoma East, Algoma—Manitoulin, Nipissing, Parry Sound—Muskoka, Sudbury and Timiskaming—Cochrane ridings. It has traditionally included much of the Sudbury District and small parts of the Algoma, Nipissing and Timiskaming Districts, along with all but the urban core of Greater Sudbury.

It consisted initially of parts of the territorial districts of Sudbury and Algoma, and excluding the city of Sudbury, town of Copper Cliff, and the township of McKim. In 1966, it was redefined to consist of parts of the territorial districts of Sudbury excluding the City of Sudbury and the Town of Copper Cliff, and the northeast part of the territorial district of Manitoulin.

In 1976, it was redefined to consist of the southern part of Regional Municipality of Sudbury, the southeast part of the Territorial District of Sudbury, and the part of the Territorial District of Manitoulin including and lying east of the Townships of Killarney, and Rutherford and George Island.

In 1987, it was redefined to consist of the southern part of the Regional Municipality of Sudbury; the geographic townships of Cartier, Cascaden, Foy, Hart, Harty, Hess and Moncrieff and that part of the geographic Township of Trill not within the Town of Walden in the Territorial District of Sudbury; Wahnapitei Indian reserve No. 11; and Whitefish Lake Indian Reserve No. 6.

In 1996, it was redefined to consist of:
 the part of the Territorial District of Timiskaming lying west of the eastern limit of the geographic townships of Douglas and Geikie;
 the Territorial District of Sudbury excluding:
 the part lying west of the eastern boundary of the townships of Shenango, Lemoine, Carty, Pinogami, Biggs, Rollo, Swayze, Cunningham, Blamey, Shipley, Singapore, Burr and Edighoffer;
 the part lying south and west of and including the townships of Acheson, Venturi, Ermatinger, Totten and west of but excluding the Regional Municipality of Sudbury, and west of but including the Townships of Foster and Curtin.
 the part lying east of a line and including the Townships of Stull, Valin, Cotton, Beresford and Creelman, east of and excluding the Regional Municipality of Sudbury and the Township of Hawley, east of and excluding the Townships of Hendrie and Hoskin, east of and excluding the Townships of Cosby, Mason and Martland;
 the part of Regional Municipality of Sudbury south of a line drawn from east to west along Highway 69, south along Long Lake Road,  and west along the north boundary of the Township of Broder.

In 2003, it was given its current boundaries as described above.

This riding lost fractions of territory to Nipissing—Timiskaming and Algoma—Manitoulin—Kapuskasing during the 2012 electoral redistribution.

Members of Parliament
This riding has elected the following Members of Parliament:

Election results

	

|align="left" colspan=2|New Democratic Party gain from Liberal
|align="right"|Swing
|align="right"| +12.42
|align="right"|

				

		
Note: Conservative vote is compared to the total of the Canadian Alliance vote and Progressive Conservative vote in 2000 election.

				
Note: Canadian Alliance vote is compared to the Reform vote in 1997 election.				
			

			
					

					
		

Note: NDP vote is compared to CCF vote in 1958 election.

See also
 List of Canadian federal electoral districts
 Historical federal electoral districts of Canada

References

 Campaign expense data from Elections Canada
Riding history from the Library of Parliament
 2011 results from Elections Canada

Notes

Ontario federal electoral districts
Sudbury District
Belt regions
Politics of Greater Sudbury
West Nipissing